James Buchanan (22 February 1908 – 13 May 1989) was a South African cricketer. He played in twenty-one first-class matches from 1936/37 to 1953/54.

References

External links
 

1908 births
1989 deaths
South African cricketers
Eastern Province cricketers
Rhodesia cricketers
Cricketers from Port Elizabeth